S610 may refer to :
 Laubie (S610), a German Type VII submarine
 Foudroyant (S610), a French ballistic missile submarine of the Le Redoutable type
 NW-S610, a Sony walkman series